Glyphodes mascarenalis is a moth of the family Crambidae described by Joseph de Joannis in his book Descriptions de Lépidoptères nouveaux de l'ile Maurice in 1906. It is found in the Indian Ocean on the islands Comoros, Réunion, and Mauritius.

See also
List of moths of Mauritius
List of moths of Réunion
List of moths of Comoros

References

Moths described in 1906
Glyphodes
Moths of the Comoros
Moths of Mauritius
Moths of Réunion
Moths of Africa